The Paul Banks and Carolyn Harris Preservation Award (known informally as the Banks/Harris award),  is awarded by the Association for Library Collections and Technical Services (ALCTS), a division of the American Library Association. The award was established to honor the memory of Paul N. Banks and Carolyn Harris, two early leaders in library preservation. The award consists of a citation and a $1,500 grant, donated by Preservation Technologies, L.P.

The award recognizes the contribution of a professional preservation specialist who has been active in the field of preservation or conservation for library or archival materials.

Past recipients 
 2001 Sally Buchanan—associate professor at the University of Pittsburgh School of Information Science.
 2002 Ellen R. McCrady d.2008 — Editor and publisher of the Abbey Newsletter for preservation professionals from 1975 to 2004 and the Alkaline Paper Advocate from 1988 to 2008. She also conducted research regarding papermaking and acid testing.
 2003 John F. Dean—head of  the Department of Preservation and Conservation at [[Cornell University}]] since its beginning in 1985.
 2004 Janice Merrill-Oldham—Malloy-Rabinowitz Preservation Librarian at Harvard University, overseeing the Weissman Preservation Center and the Preservation and Imaging Department.
 2005 Paul Conway—professor in the University of Michigan School of Information and has worked with Yale University and Duke University after beginning his career at the Gerald R. Ford Presidential Library. His  work focuses on digital preservation and electronic media.
 2006 Gary Frost—conservator at the University of Iowa Libraries, leader in the field of library preservation for over 35 years.
 2007 Walter Henry 2007 — conservator at the Stanford University Libraries and Academic Information Resources, creator of Conservation OnLine and the Conservation DistList.
 2008 Janet Gertz—Director for Preservation, Columbia University Libraries, former chair of ALCTS' Preservation and Reformatting Section (PARS).
 2009 Barclay W. Ogden—Head of the Preservation Department at the University of California, Berkeley Library System, leader in disaster planning.
 2010 Michèle V. Cloonan—dean and professor of the Graduate School of Library and Information Science, Simmons College
 2011 Roberta Pilette—Director of the Preservation Department and Chief Preservation Officer for the Yale University Library
 2012 Julie Allen Page—Co-coordinator of the  California Preservation Program (CPP) and the Western States & Territories Preservation Assistance Service (WESTPAS).
 2013 Randy Silverman—Preservation Librarian, University of Utah.
 2014 James M. Reilly—Director, Image Permanence Institute.
 2015 Jeanne Drewes—Chief of Binding and Collections Care Division, Library of Congress.
 2016 Ellen Cunningham-Kruppa, associate director and Head of the Preservation and Conservation Division at the Harry Ransom Center, UT-Austin
 2017 Karen Kiorpes, Preservation Librarian for the university at Albany, SUNY, University Libraries
 2018 Nancy E. Kraft, Head of the Preservation Department at the University of Iowa,
 2019 Paula De Stefano, the Barbara Goldsmith Curator for Preservation and head of the Preservation Department at New York University Libraries
 2020 Jennifer Hain Teper  of the University of Illinois at Urbana Champaign,
2021, will not be awarded.

References

External links
 The Paul Banks and Carolyn Harris Preservation Award
 Preservation Technologies, L.P.: Paul Banks and Carolyn Harris Preservation Award

American awards
Awards established in 2001